Surajkaradi is a census town in Jamnagar district in the Indian state of Gujarat.

Demographics
 India census, Surajkaradi had a population of 16,793. Males constitute 52% of the population and females 48%. Surajkaradi has an average literacy rate of 51%, lower than the national average of 59.5%: male literacy is 60%, and female literacy is 41%. In Surajkaradi, 15% of the population is under 6 years of age.

References

Cities and towns in Jamnagar district